Cercospora minima is a fungal plant pathogen. In the European pear, it is the cause of the disease known as late leaf spot.  The geographic distribution includes India, South America, and the south-eastern United States.

References

minima
Fungal tree pathogens and diseases
Pear tree diseases
Fungi of North America
Fungi of South America
Fungi of India
Fungi described in 1896